Gustavo Fabián López (born April 28, 1983) is an Argentinian footballer who currently plays for PS TIRA.

He previously played in Argentine Primera División, and in the top leagues of Venezuela, Indonesia, Malaysia, El Salvador, Puerto Rico, and Montenegro.

Honours

Club honors
Budućnost Podgorica
Montenegrin First League (1): 2007–08

River Plate Puerto Rico
Puerto Rico Soccer League (1): 2010
Puerto Rico Soccer League Regular Season Cup (1): 2009

Arema Cronus
East Java Governor Cup (1): 2013

External links
  at Soccerpunter
  Primera División Argentina ststistics
  Stats from Montenegro  at FSCG.co.me

Living people
1983 births
People from La Matanza Partido
Argentine footballers
Association football midfielders
Club Atlético Lanús footballers
Club Atlético Los Andes footballers
Atlético Balboa footballers
Alianza F.C. footballers
Terengganu FC players
FK Budućnost Podgorica players
Estudiantes de Mérida players
Argentine Primera División players
Liga 1 (Indonesia) players
Malaysia Super League players
Argentine expatriate footballers
Expatriate footballers in Venezuela
Expatriate footballers in Indonesia
Expatriate footballers in El Salvador
Expatriate footballers in Montenegro
Expatriate footballers in Puerto Rico
Argentine expatriate sportspeople in Venezuela
Argentine expatriate sportspeople in Indonesia
Argentine expatriate sportspeople in El Salvador
Argentine expatriate sportspeople in Montenegro
Argentine expatriate sportspeople in Puerto Rico
Sportspeople from Buenos Aires Province